Gabriel Teixeira Machado (born 2 September 1989) is a Brazilian footballer who plays as a forward for FC Regensdorf.

Career

Juventude

Machado started his career at Juventude, signed a 3-year contract in December 2005. He made his debut in Campeonato Brasileiro Série A 2007.

Grasshopper

In January 2008, at age of 18, he signed a contract until June 2009 with Grasshopper.

Nyon

In January 2009, he joined Nyon of Swiss Challenge League.

Universitatea Cluj
In August 2009, he joined Universitatea Cluj. In his first year with the team he scored 9 goals and helped U Cluj to promote to the Liga I. This also made him team top scorer. On 9 February 2011, Machado signed a new three-year contract, holding him at the Romanian side until the Summer of 2014.

Steaua București

In January 2012, he joined Steaua București of Liga I.

Syrianska FC

In August 2013, he joined Syrianska FC of 2013 Allsvenskan.

Universitatea Cluj

In January 2014, he returned to Universitatea Cluj of Liga I but six months later the club announced that the player has been dismissed.

Career statistics
(Correct as of 22 November 2011)

References

External links
Official FCSB profile  
Profile at Golbo.com's Futpedia 

Profile at Swiss Football League 

Brazilian footballers
Brazilian expatriate footballers
Swiss Super League players
Esporte Clube Juventude players
Grasshopper Club Zürich players
FC Stade Nyonnais players
FC Universitatea Cluj players
FC Steaua București players
Syrianska FC players
Liga I players
Allsvenskan players
Association football forwards
Expatriate footballers in Switzerland
Expatriate footballers in Romania
Expatriate footballers in Sweden
Footballers from Porto Alegre
1989 births
Living people